The International Journal of Low-Carbon Technologies is an open access peer reviewed academic journal of low-carbon technologies. It is published by Oxford University Press.

References 

Oxford University Press academic journals
Open access journals
Engineering journals